A Mithraeum , sometimes spelled Mithreum and Mithraion, is a Mithraic temple, erected in classical antiquity by the worshippers of Mithras. Most Mithraea can be dated between 100 BC and 300 AD, mostly in the Roman Empire.

The Mithraeum was either an adapted natural cave or cavern, or a building imitating a cave. Where possible, the Mithraeum was constructed within or below an existing building, such as the Mithraeum found beneath the Basilica of San Clemente in Rome. While most Mithraea are underground, some feature openings in the ceiling to allow light to enter, a reminder of the connection to the universe and the passage of time. The site of a Mithraeum may also be identified by its singular entrance or vestibule, which stands across from an apse at the back of which stands an altar on a pedestal, often in a recess, and its "cave", called the Spelaeum or Spelunca, with raised benches along the side walls for the ritual meal. Many mithraea that follow this basic plan are scattered over much of the Roman Empire's former territory, particularly where the legions were stationed along the frontiers (such as Britain). Others may be recognized by their characteristic layout, even though converted into crypts beneath Christian churches.

From the structure of the Mithraea it is possible to surmise that worshippers would have gathered for a common meal seated on the benches lining the walls.

The Mithraeum primarily functioned as an area for initiation, into which the soul descends and exits. The Mithraeum itself was arranged as an "image of the universe".  It is noticed by some researchers that this movement, especially in the context of mithraic iconography (see below), seems to stem from the neoplatonic concept that the "running" of the sun from solstice to solstice is a parallel for the movement of the soul through the universe, from pre-existence, into the body, and then beyond the physical body into an afterlife.

Notable mithraea
Belgium
 Tienen Mithraeum

Bosnia
 Jajce
 Konjic

France
 Angers
 Biesheim
 Mackwiller
 Mariana
 Sarrebourg
 Strasbourg (district of Koenigshoffen)

Germany

 Cologne
 Dieburg/Darmstadt
 Frankfurt-Heddernheim
 Freiburg im Breisgau, mithraeum relics from Riegel displayed in Freiburg museum
 Gimmeldingen, Mithras-Heiligtum  Gimmeldingen Sehenswertes (German language) 
 Güglingen
 Hanau
 Heidelberg, Kurpfälzisches Museum 
 Königsbrunn (near Augsburg)
 Mainz, Consecration Altars of the Mithraeum Mogontiacum
 Neuss (Legionslager Castra Novaesia)
 Osterburken
 Riegel am Kaiserstuhl (near Freiburg im Breisgau)
 Saalburg  
 Saarbrücken 
 Schwarzerden 
 Wiesloch

Greece
 Elefsina
 Aigio
 Thermes

Hungary
Aquincum Mithraeum (of Victorinus). Remains open within Aquincum Archaeological Park.
Savaria Mithraeum
Fertorakos Mithraeum

Israel
Caesarea Maritima
Possibly in Jerusalem, Via Dolorosa, near the Second Station, where two vases with specific iconography were excavated

Italy

In the city of Rome:
Mithraeum of the Circus Maximus. Remains open by appointment.
Barberini Mithraeum. Remains open by appointment.
Mithraeum of San Clemente, under the basilica of San Clemente. Remains visible in the archaeological museum.
Mithraeum of the Baths of Caracalla. Remains open by appointment.
Castra Peregrinorum mithraeum, under the church of Santo Stefano Rotondo. Remains open by appointment.
Mithraeum under the Santa Prisca basilica. Remains open by appointment.
Mithraeum of the Seven Spheres, in Ostia Antica
In Campania:
Mithraeum of  Santa Maria Capua Vetere
Mithraeum of Naples

Romania
A reconstructed Mithraeum in the Brukenthal Museum's Lapidarium, with some of the items unearthed at Apulum (Alba Iulia).  
Ulpia Traiana Sarmizegetusa.

Spain
Roman Ville of Fuente Álamo's Mithraeum (Puente Genil).
Archaeological site at Emerita Augusta.
University Museum A Domus do Mitreo (The Domus of the Mithraeum) next to the Roman walls of Lugo, in Galicia.

Switzerland
Martigny (ancient Octodurus) - a reconstructed Mithraeum 

Syria
Duro-Europos - Transported to and rebuilt at Yale University's Gallery of Fine Arts.
Hawarte

United Kingdom
Caernarfon Mithraeum, Wales.
Carrawburgh, Hadrian's Wall, England. Remains open.
London Mithraeum, England. Remains open.
Rudchester Mithraeum, England.

References

External links
 List of mithraea from Mithraeum.eu
 Capua's Mithraeum (Santa Maria Capua Vetere)

 

nl:Taurobolium